List of MPs elected in the 1780 British general election

This is a list of the 558 MPs or Members of Parliament elected to the 314 constituencies of the Parliament of Great Britain in 1780, the 15th Parliament of Great Britain and their replacements returned at subsequent by-elections, arranged by constituency.



By-elections 
List of Great Britain by-elections (1774–90)

See also
1780 British general election
List of parliaments of Great Britain
Unreformed House of Commons

References

1780
 
1780 in Great Britain
Lists of Members of the Parliament of Great Britain